Beaverville may refer to the following places:

Beaverville, Illinois, U.S.
Beaverville Township, Iroquois County, Illinois, U.S.
Beaverville, New Jersey, U.S.

See also

 Beaver (disambiguation)
 Beaverton (disambiguation)
 Beavertown (disambiguation)
 Beaver City (disambiguation)